Yersinia aleksiciae is a Gram-negative bacteria that is commonly isolated from the feces of warm-blooded animals such as humans, reindeers, and pigs. The type strain is Y159 (=WA758 =DSM 14987 =LMG 22254).

Etymology
N.L. gen. fem. n. aleksiciae, of Aleksic, in honor of Professor Stojanka Aleksic, Hamburg, Germany for her studies on the epidemiology and microbiology of Yersinia.

References

External links
LPSN: Species Yersinia aleksiciae

aleksiciae
Bacteria described in 2005